Golden Shackles is a 1928 American silent drama film directed by Dallas M. Fitzgerald and starring Grant Withers, Priscilla Bonner and LeRoy Mason.

Cast
 Grant Withers as Frank Fordyce 
 Priscilla Bonner as Lucy Weston 
 LeRoy Mason as Herbert Fordyce 
 Ruth Stewart as Vivi Norton

References

Citations

Sources
 Munden, Kenneth White. The American Film Institute Catalog of Motion Pictures Produced in the United States, Part 1. University of California Press, 1997.

External links
 

1928 films
1928 drama films
1920s English-language films
American silent feature films
Silent American drama films
Films directed by Dallas M. Fitzgerald
American black-and-white films
1920s American films